Police surgeon may refer to:
Police Surgeon (British TV series), a British ITV television series from 1960
Dr. Simon Locke, also known as Police Surgeon, a Canadian syndicated television series from 1971-1974
 The topic of forensic pathology